Karlrecords is a Berlin-based record label founded in 2006 by Thomas Herbst. The label  focuses on many different approaches to experimental and electroacoustic music.
Alongside with publishing new music, the Karlrecords also reissued various works, like Silver Apples of the Moon by Morton Subotnick and published a new edition of Iannis Xenakis Persepolis.

Artists 
The following are artists with releases on Karlrecords:

 dieANGEL (Ilpo Väisänen and Dirk Dresselhaus)
 Arovane
 Audrey Chen
 Bérangère Maximin
 Bill Laswell
 Fret
 Gareth Davis
 Giulio Aldinucci
 Hanno Leichtmann
 Hans Castrup
 Iannis Xenakis
 Karkhana
 Keiji Haino
 Konstrukt 
 Laurent De Schepper Trio
 Martina Bertoni
 Morton Subotnick
 Nickolas Mohanna
 Porya Hatami
 Thurston Moore
 Zeitkratzer

References

External links
 Karlrecords official website
 Karlrecords on Discogs

German record labels